Thomas Gerald Tait (7 November 1866, in Campbeltown – 19 December 1938, in Glasgow) was a Scottish sailor who competed for the Royal Clyde Yacht Club at the 1908 Summer Olympics.

He was a crew member of the Scottish boat Hera, which won the gold medal in the 12 metre class.

References

External links 
 
 

1866 births
1938 deaths
People from Campbeltown
Sailors at the 1908 Summer Olympics – 12 Metre
Olympic sailors of Great Britain
British male sailors (sport)
Olympic gold medallists for Great Britain
Olympic medalists in sailing
Scottish Olympic medallists
Scottish male sailors (sport)
Medalists at the 1908 Summer Olympics
Sportspeople from Argyll and Bute